Texas Gulf Coast is an intertidal zone which borders the coastal region of South Texas, Southeast Texas, and the Texas Coastal Bend.

Administrative divisions of Texas Gulf Coast

There are 14 Texas counties encompassing the Gulf of Mexico coastal boundary;

Topography of Texas Gulf Coast
The Texas coastal bend sustains the Texas–Gulf water resource region as a hydrological cycle unifying a drainage basin of river deltas at the littoral zone of the Texas Gulf Coast.

Texas coastal management and impact resiliency
In accordance with the Coastal Zone Management Act and Coastal Barrier Resources Act, the Texas Gulf shores maintain a coastal management program striving to prohibit coastal erosion, coastal hazards, sea-level rise, and tidal flooding. The Texas beach observed the initial coastal bulkhead and construction of the Galveston Seawall subsequently to the 1900 hurricane and 1915 hurricane levying a direct catastrophic impact at Galveston Island. The Texas surf exemplifies a coastal defence with a seawall at North Padre Island, retaining wall at South Padre Island, and a revetment at Sargent Beach.

Imagery of Texas Early 20th Century Hurricanes

Texas Gulf Bays and Coastal Waterways 
The Texas gulf coast has a geography of ten coastal bays and bountiful with waterway inlets;

Waterway inlets of Texas Barrier Islands

The Texas coastal bend has a geography of waterways fringed by the Texas barrier islands. The Texas seacoast is collectively multitudinal with navigable straits traversing watercraft access as a concourse to the Gulf Intracoastal Waterway and the Texas estuaries.

National and state parks of Texas Gulf Shores 

The Texas Parks and Wildlife Department oversees the Texas state parks located on the Gulf of Mexico shores with the exception of Padre Island seashore which is maintained by the National Park Service.

Nature sanctuaries of Texas Coastal Zones
The United States Fish and Wildlife Service governs the nature reserves as land parcels of the National Wildlife Refuge System bordering the Texas coastal zones.

Antiquity of Texas Gulf Coast

European Colonization of Texas Coast 

North American expeditions and exploratory endeavors emerged with the europeans engaging their efforts for transatlantic crossings during the late fifteenth century.

Exploration of Spanish Conquistador 
The Texas marginal seacoast acknowledged the arrival or entradas of Álvar Núñez Cabeza de Vaca during the first quarter century of the 1500s. Cabeza de Vaca, a Spanish conquistador and a successor of Christopher Columbus, embarked on a calamitous coastal ship landing near the shore of Galveston Island on November 6, 1528.

New Spain economic currency and perils of Spanish Sea 
In 1554, a Spanish cargo ship known as the San Esteban was tacking from Veracruz due north along the Texas Gulf Coast with an eastern destination at Havana and the West Indies. The New Spain galleon encountered a severe tropical cyclone in the Spanish Sea proximate the 27th parallel north and 97th meridian west decimating the Spanish treasure fleet known as Espiritu Santo, San Estaban, and Santa Maria de Yciar. The shipwreck derelict is entitled as a National Register of Historic Places. The underwater archaeology site was established as the Mansfield Cut Underwater Archeological District at Padre Island National Seashore in 1974.

Expedition of France Monarchy 
The Texas oceanic basin was colonized by the France monarchy or Louis XIV from 1684 to 1689. In 1684, Robert Cavelier de La Salle sailing under the French ensigns guided an expedition in the Spanish Sea of four ships known as L'Aimable, La Belle, Le Joly, and St. François. La Salle and Henri de Tonti were pursuing the Mississippi River Delta seeking to discover the French colonial empire of New France. In 1685, La Salle navigated beyond the Atchafalaya Basin and lower Mississippi River basin inaccurately discovering Matagorda Bay where the French cargo vessels anchored near Indianola, Texas. During 1685 to 1689, the La Salle colonists adventured north of Lavaca Bay establishing a land settlement known as Fort St. Louis near Garcitas Creek and Inez, Texas ratifying the French colonization of Texas.

Spanish Empire and Transformation of North Americas 
The Texas Gulf coast attested to a second wave of the European colonization of the Americas with the introduction of colonialism by the Spanish Empire in 1690. The España cultural evolution substantiated a christianization or religious conquest by the transatlantic crossing of the Spanish Inquisition. The España colonization established the Viceroyalty of New Spain administratively structuring an interior province known as Spanish Texas from 1690 to 1821. Beginning in 1810, the Mexican War of Independence was settled with the Spanish Empire ennobling a discontinuation of the Mexican Inquisition while creating the First Mexican Empire in 1821.

19th Century of Texas Gulf Coast

French Corsairs of Gulf Waters and Texas Shores 
The Texas Gulf coast served as a sanctuary for seafaring buccaneers, corsairs, privateers, and non-fictional practitioners of the piracy occupation. Galveston Bay and Matagorda Bay were the Texas coast fertile crescent for anchorage and concealment of the barque, barquentine, and brigantine class sailing vessels.

In the early nineteenth century, Jean Lafitte and Pierre Lafitte, kinship of french basque and sea-going privateers, managed a modest metal forging establishment known as the Lafitte's Blacksmith Shop in the New Orleans French Quarter. In 1807, the 10th United States Congress passed the Embargo Act of 1807 coercing the displacement of the Lafitte's venture to Barataria, Louisiana settled south of New Orleans within the Mississippi River Delta region.

By 1808, the Lafittes' discovered brigandage to be an invaluable endeavor smuggling pirate booty from Barataria Bay to New Orleans. In 1814, the United States Navy launched a naval offensive on the Baratarian's prize of war enterprise debilitating the Lafitte's French corsair sailing fleet.

After the remnants of the War of 1812, Jean Lafitte departed Grand Terre Island and the wetlands of Louisiana setting the sails for Galveston Island, Texas. In early 1817, freebooter Jean Lafitte established a piracy colony at Galveston Island. Frenchman Lafitte constructed his Maison Rouge residence perpendicular of the Galveston Channel and Pelican Island with the surroundings of a corsair's piracy settlement. The Brethren of the Coast discovered the Galveston landscape to be conducive for passage to the gulf waters supporting sailing ship tactics to intercept merchant ships and Spanish Empire armadas accomplishing the nautical journey from the Old World.

After the Galveston Hurricane of 1818, French privateer Lafitte abandoned Galveston Bay for the Bay of Campeche beseeching safe conduct at the cays of Campeche Bank. By 1821, the Texas seacoast exodus was resolutely coerced by the authorization of the 15th United States Congress legislative article known as the Piracy Suppression Act of 1819 enacted into law by United States President James Monroe on March 3, 1819.

In 1814, Lord Byron authored a poetic publication The Corsair which was conceivably an attribute to the life of Jean Lafitte. In 1927, Galveston's William Moody Jr. erected the Jean Lafitte Hotel in the Galveston's Strand Historic District as an observance of privateer Lafitte's origins on the Galveston Island shores.

Mexico Governance, Texas Revolution, and Republic of Texas
Texas revered the first glance of the Texas Revolution with the Fredonian Rebellion occurring from 1826 to 1827 in the East Texas vicinity of Nacogdoches, Texas.

After the conflict of cultural imperialism ceased between Mexico and Spain, the Law of April 6, 1830 and Treaty of Limits furthered the successive uniformity known as Mexican Texas from 1828 to 1836.

In 1836, Texas independence was expeditiously declared from the imperialism of Mexico subsequently to the San Felipe de Austin and Texian Consultation events;

and the forthcoming establishment and separation of powers for the Republic of Texas.

Mexican State Naval Operations and Texas Gulf Coast
The Texas Gulf Coast provided a naval supply lifeline for the Texian Army and Texian Militia during the Texas Revolution sustaining from 1835 to 1836. The Texian Navy sustained the Texian revolutionary infantry forces by providing a flotilla for the safe passage of munitions and supply provisions. The Mobile and New Orleans harbors routing merchant ships defined a vast maritime area for the Texas Navy skirting the Texas seacoast while surveilling the Mexican state nautical hostilities and naval warfare on the Third Coast.

The Mexican Navy enforced coastline patrols and naval blockades of the Texas Gulf Coast harbors during the strife for Texas independence. The Texas naval forces appropriated four man-of-war schooners as a naval offensive for the sailing ship tactics of the Mexican Navy. The Texas Navy engaged four warships from 1835 to 1838 known as Brutus, Independence, Invincible, and Liberty for the establishment of the Republic of Texas and decisively the Texas annexation on December 29, 1845.

Infectious Disease Epidemic and Texas Seacoast 
In 1860s, the Texas coastal counties encountered a disease vector which inflicted an arbovirus on the Texas ocean front townships. The pathogen transmission was potentially infiltrating the trade ports through merchant ships, nautical vessels, and seafaring watercraft along the Texas coastline. The predatorial Aedes aegypti yield a mosquito-borne disease aggressively disseminating an infection known as yellow fever on the South Texas civil parishes from the nineteenth century to the early twentieth century.

United States National Security of Texas Gulf Coastline 
The Texas Gulf coast had a vital necessity for seacoast defense as the international relations of superiority cultivated during the late 19th century to the mid-20th century. The United States artillery installations were erected during the Spanish–American War frequently referred as Cuban War of Independence, and relatively to the world war periods of the 1910s and 1940s.

The Texas coastal artillery command posts were established as casemates or pillboxes developed with reinforced concrete strategically situated at Bolivar Peninsula, Texas and Galveston Island, Texas. The United States Army Coast Artillery Corps commanded the operations of the coastal artillery emplacements which originated as Fort Crockett, Fort San Jacinto, Fort Travis, and inclusion of Sabine Pass. The artillery fortifications achieved the purposes of economic warfare or embargo for Galveston Bay, vigilance of maritime security, and safeguarding the trade routes for Port of Galveston and the Port of Houston.

Imagery of Texas Gulf Coast Fortress Installations

See also

References

Bibliography

Periodical Publications

Texas Coastal Science

External links
 
 
 
 
 

Geography of Texas
Landforms of Texas
Regions of Texas